Jeremy Peterson may refer to:

 Jeremy Peterson (politician), member of the Utah House of Representatives
 Jeremy Peterson (Hollyoaks), a character on the British television soap opera Hollyoaks